Sins and Secrets (also styled Sins & Secrets) is an American documentary television series on Investigation Discovery that debuted February 17, 2011. Each program profiles a notorious crime by detailing the city or community where the crime took place, often focusing on details from the personal lives of individual investigators. The show has been compared to the A&E series City Confidential.

Episodes

Season 1 (2011)

Season 2 (2012)

Season 3 (2012)

Season 4 (2013)

References

2010s American documentary television series
2011 American television series debuts
2010s American crime television series
American non-fiction television series
True crime television series
Investigation Discovery original programming
2013 American television series endings